Nikolai Semenovich Klestov (Russian:  Николай Семёнович Клестов; December 1873, Smolensk – 27 July 1941, Kommunarka shooting ground, Moscow Oblast) who worked with the pen name Angarsky, was a Russian Bolshevik revolutionary, political writer and publicist.

He published works by Karl Marx, Alexander Bogdanov and Vladimir Lenin, alongside other publications for the Russian Social Democratic Labor Party before being exiled to Angarsky District, Siberia. He then adopted the pseudonym Angarskii. Klestov wrote works on party history and that of the revolutionary movement, as well as literary criticism.

Following the February Revolution in 1917, Klestov became a member of the Bolsheviks (RSDLP(B)) and was a member of the Executive Committee of the Moscow Soviet, running their press section. He attended the Seventh (April) Conference and Sixth Congress of the RSDLP(B), at which he was criticised by Stalin. He participated in the October Revolution in Moscow and played a role in the Military Revolutionary Committee, Khamovniki district. He worked for the Moscow Soviet until 1929. He edited the journal Tvorchestvo (1919–22), the literary collections Nedra (1922–24), and ran the publishing house Nedra (1924–29). He was appointed trade representative for the USSR in Lithuania from 1929 to 1931 and then in Greece from 1932 to 1936.

In 1936 he became chairman  Mezhdunarodnaia Kniga (International Book), of the foreign book trade association for the USSR. In 1939 he started work at the Marx–Engels–Lenin Institute.

In May 1940 he was arrested on charges of espionage and, after a forced confession, executed in July 1941.

References

1873 births
1941 deaths
Bolsheviks
People executed by the Soviet Union by firearm
Revolutionaries from the Russian Empire